This is a list of brands owned by Keurig Dr Pepper.

Products by country

United States

Soft drinks
 7UP
 Bai Brands LLC
 A&W Root Beer
 A&W Cream Soda
 Cactus Cooler
 Canada Dry
 Canfield's
 Clamato
 Crush 
 Dejà Blue
 Diet Rite
 Dr Pepper
 Hawaiian Punch
 Hires Root Beer
 IBC Root Beer
 Margaritaville
 Mott's
 Mr & Mrs T
 Nantucket Nectars
 Nehi
 Peñafiel
 RC Cola
 ReaLemon
 Rose's
 Schweppes
 Snapple
 Squirt
 Stewart's Fountain Classics
 Sun Drop
 Sunkist
 Venom
 Vernors
 Wink
 Yoo-hoo

Coffees
Diedrich Coffee
Green Mountain
Timothy's World Coffee
Tully's Coffee
Van Houtte

Brewing machines
 Keurig

Canada

Soft Drinks
 Canada Dry (club soda, tonic water, ginger ale, diet ginger ale, cranberry flavored ginger ale, green tea ginger ale) 
 C'plus (orange, C'plus Wink)
 Crush (cream soda, birch beer, grape, lime, orange, pineapple) 
 Dr Pepper and Diet Dr Pepper  
 Hires Root Beer and cream soda 
 RC Cola 
 Schweppes (tonic water, ginger ale, diet ginger ale)
 Vernors 
 Snapple 
 Stewart's Fountain Classics (Root Beer, Orange & Cream, Wishniak, Black Cherry, Key Lime, Cream Soda) 
 Golden Cockerel (ginger beer) 
 Sussex Golden Ginger Ale
 Mott's Clamato (regular, the Works, Extra Spicy) 
 Mott's Garden Cocktail (Regular & Low Sodium) 
 Mr & Mrs T (daiquiri, margarita, pina colada) 
 ReaLemon 
 ReaLime 
 Rose's Lime Cordial
 Rose's Cocktail Infusions (cranberry, blueberry, green apple) 
 Rose's Grenadine 
 Mott's Fruitsations (Fruit snacks, apple sauces, juices and Fruit with Supplement)

Coffees
Green Mountain
Timothy's World Coffee
Van Houtte

Mexico
 Peñafiel Mineral Water
 Peñafiel Fruit Sodas
 Peñafiel Naturel- Low calorie fruit sodas sweetened with Splenda.
 Peñafiel Frutal- Peñafiel Mineral Water with a hint of fruit flavor (strawberry, apple), sweetened with Splenda.
 Peñafiel Twist- Peñafiel Mineral Water with a hint of lime.
 Squirt, Squirt Light and Squirt Rusa (salt and lime). (distributed by Pepsi in some states and by Aga in other states).
 Canada Dry (distributed by Pepsi in some areas)
 Aguafiel purified water, frutal (Jamaica, lime, mango, orange) and frutal cero (Jamaica, apple) sweetened with Splenda.
 Clamato
 Crush
 Snapple
 Schweppes
 Dr Pepper

References 

 Dr Pepper brands

Keurig Dr Pepper
Keurig Dr Pepper